Australia Has Wings is a 1941 short Australian documentary film made as propaganda for World War II which shows the development of the Australian aircraft industry, particularly production of the CAC Wirraway.

It was made by Commonwealth Film Laboratories for the Department of Information.

Release
The film screened in Australia and overseas.

References

External links
Copy of complete film at Australian War Memorial

1941 films
Australian World War II propaganda films
1941 short films
Australian short documentary films
1940s short documentary films
Australian aviation films
1941 documentary films
1940s English-language films